The 1995 IIHF European U18 Championship was the twenty-eighth playing of the IIHF European Junior Championships.

Group A
Played from April 10 to 16 in Berlin Germany. Led by Jochen Hecht and Marco Sturm the hosts made history, and very nearly won the tournament.  For the second time in tournament history, someone other than the Swedes, Finns, Russians, or Czechs finished in the top four. And for the first time, someone else than those four won a medal.  Team Germany opened by tying the Czechs, then followed that up by actually beating the Russians.  Their only loss was to tournament champion Finland, and they still had a chance for gold on the last day of the tournament.

First round
Group 1

Group 2

Final round
Championship round

Placing round

Norway was relegated to Group B for 1996.

Tournament Awards
Top Scorer  Pavel Rosa (11 points)
Top Goalie: Kai Fischer
Top Defenceman:Jaako Niskavaara
Top Forward: Sergei Samsonov

Group B
Played from March 25 to the 31st, in Senica and Skalica, Slovakia.  The hosts dominated all five of their games leaving no doubt that they belonged at the top level of European junior hockey.

First round 
Group 1

Group 2

Final round
Championship round

Placing round

Slovakia was promoted to Group A and Austria was relegated to Group C, for 1996.

C1 Group 
Played from March 24 to the 30th, in Kyiv Ukraine. Ukraine, Latvia, and Slovenia finished in a tie for first, equal on head-to-head points, Ukraine and Latvia were still even on head-to-head goal differential, so overall goal differential was used to establish first place.

Ukraine was promoted to Group B.  No team was relegated as the six team C1 was expanded to an eight team Group C.

C2 Group
Played from March 11 to 17, in Elektrenai, Lithuania.

First round 
Group 1

Group 2

Final round
Championship round

Placing round

Both Lithuania and Croatia were promoted to Group C, everyone else stayed in what would be called Group D, in 1996.

References

Complete results

Junior
IIHF European Junior Championship tournament
April 1995 sports events in Europe
1995 in Berlin
Sports competitions in Berlin
International ice hockey competitions hosted by Germany
Junior
Senica
Junior
March 1995 sports events in Europe
Sport in Elektrėnai
Junior
Junior
International ice hockey competitions hosted by Ukraine
International ice hockey competitions hosted by Lithuania
Sports competitions in Kyiv
1990s in Kyiv